Battle of Ganja may refer to:

 Battle of Ganja (1804)
 Battle of Ganja (1826)